Henry Hardenbergh may refer to:

 Henry Janeway Hardenbergh (1847–1918), American architect
 Henry M. Hardenbergh (1843–1865), recipient of the Medal of Honor